Gouverneur Frank Mosher (1871 – July 19, 1941) was an Episcopal Missionary Bishop of the Philippine Islands. He was born at Stapleton, New York (Staten Island) and studied at Union College, Schenectady and Berkeley Divinity School in Middletown, Connecticut. He served as a missionary priest in China from 1896 to 1920, and was consecrated Missionary Bishop of the Philippine Islands on February 25, 1920, in the Church of Our Saviour, Shanghai. He was a member of the Psi Upsilon fraternity.

References
Gouverneur Frank Mosher, 1871–1941, missionary priest in China, 1896–1920, missionary bishop of the Philippine islands, 1920–1941 by F.S.S. Mosher (1942)

External links
 

1871 births
1941 deaths
Episcopal bishops of the Philippine Islands